Ö1 Campus (formerly oe1campus) is a webradio broadcast by the ORF. It is targeted mainly towards students and migrants. Ö1 Campus produces its own specialized program, but some contents, in particular the news, are taken from Ö1.

See also
 List of radio stations in Austria

External links
 Ö1 Campus website

Radio stations in Austria
Radio stations established in 2009
2009 establishments in Austria
ORF (broadcaster)